Dragan Savkić (born 1947) is a politician in Serbia. He has served in the National Assembly of Serbia since 2016 as a member of the Serbian Progressive Party.

Political career
Savkić is the leader of Progressive Party's municipal organization in Sopot. He led the party's electoral list for the Sopot municipal assembly in the 2012 local elections.

Savkić received the 115th position on the Progressive Party's Aleksandar Vučić – Serbia Is Winning list in the 2016 Serbian parliamentary election and was elected when the list won a majority victory with 131 out of 250 mandates.

He is currently a member of the assembly committee on labour, social issues, social inclusion, and poverty reduction; a deputy member of the agriculture, forestry, and water management committee; and a member of the parliamentary friendship groups with Austria, Belarus, France, Greece, Kazakhstan, and Russia.

Personal life
Savkić currently lives in Belgrade municipality of Sopot. He previously worked in real estate.

References

1947 births
Living people
Politicians from Belgrade
Members of the National Assembly (Serbia)
Serbian Progressive Party politicians